Acton Vale may refer to:
 Acton Vale, Quebec, an industrial town in south-central Quebec, Canada
 Acton Vale, London, a district in London, England